The Central Falcons are a New Zealand based field hockey club, originating in the nation's central region. The club was established in 2020, and is one of four established to compete in Hockey New Zealand's new premier domestic competition, the Premier Hockey League.

The club unifies both men and women under one name.

The Central Falcons competed for the first time in the inaugural season of Premier Hockey League, where both the men's and women's teams won their respective tournaments.

History
Along with three other teams, the Central Falcons were founded in 2020 as part of Hockey New Zealand's development of hockey. 

The team unifies the region from Taupo to Wellington; this is also where the team gets its name. The team was named after the New Zealand falcon, which is native to the central region of New Zealand's North Island.

Teams

Men
The following players represented the men's team during the 2020 edition of the Sentinel Homes Premier Hockey League.

Dominic Dixon (GK)
Matthew van Aardt (GK)
Mackenzie Wilcox
Benedict van Woerkom
Jordan Cohen
Sean Findlay
Shea McAleese
Stephen Jenness
Joseph Hanks
Nicholas Wilson
Samuel Hiha
Patrick Madder
Dane Lett
Bradley Read
Jacob Smith
Harrison Miskimmin
Dylan Thomas
Callum Olsen
Trent Lett

Women
The following players represented the women's team during the 2020 edition of the Sentinel Homes Premier Hockey League.

Georgia Barnett (GK)
Kelly Carline (GK)
Estelle MacAdre
Kayla Whitelock
Casey Crowley
Kaitlin Cotter
Megan Hull
Jessica Kelly
Kiri Wairau-Hunter
Holly Pearson
Hope Ralph
Olivia Shannon
Michaela Curtis
Ruby Logan
Felicity Reidy
Aniwaka Roberts
Rileigh Knapp
Jenna-Rae McIntyre
Emma Rainey
Rebecca Baker
<li value=21>[[Kelsey Smith]]
{{div col end}}

References
{{reflist}}

External links
[https://blacksticksnz.co.nz/wp-content/uploads/2020/10/TheCentralFalcons.pdf Central Falcons]

[[Category:New Zealand field hockey clubs]]
[[Category:Women's field hockey teams in New Zealand]]
[[Category:Sports clubs in New Zealand]]
[[Category:Sports clubs established in 2020]]
[[Category:2020 establishments in New Zealand]]

{{Fieldhockey-team-stub}}